Kenneth D. Francisco (November 16, 1941–March 7, 2013) was an American politician who served in both chamber of the Kansas State Legislature.

Francisco was born in Lamar, Colorado on 16 November 1941. His older brother was Jim Francisco, also a future Kansas state legislator. Kenneth Francisco served in the United States Army before starting a 26-year career in public office. He served in the Kansas House of Representatives from 1975 to 1978, then 1981 to 1990, before his appointment to the Kansas Senate to succeed his brother between 1991 and 1992. Kenneth Francisco later served on the Kansas Racing Commission. Francisco died on 7 March 2013, aged 71.

References

1941 births
2013 deaths
20th-century American politicians
Democratic Party members of the Kansas House of Representatives
Democratic Party Kansas state senators
People from Lamar, Colorado
Politicians from Wichita, Kansas